Neohippus is an album by trumpeter Jack Walrath which was recorded in 1988 and released on the revamped Blue Note label.

Reception

The AllMusic review by Scott Yanow stated "Trumpeter Jack Walrath's music by the mid-'80s tended to play off of the melodies of tunes and their moods rather than merely following chord changes and predictable patterns. ... Although somewhat overlooked, Jack Walrath is always well worth checking out for he avoids the obvious and his music is full of surprise".

Track listing
All compositions by Jack Walrath 
 "Village of the Darned" – 6:40
 "Watch Your Head" – 6:41
 "Fright Night" – 6:08
 "Annie Lee" – 5:10
 "England" – 3:46
 "Beer!" – 7:50

Personnel
Jack Walrath – trumpet
Carter Jefferson – tenor saxophone, clarinet
John Abercrombie – guitar
James Williams – piano
Anthony Cox – bass 
Ronnie Burrage – drums

References

Blue Note Records albums
Jack Walrath albums
1989 albums